Ąžuolas Tubelis (born 22 March 2002) is a Lithuanian college basketball player for the Arizona Wildcats of the Pac-12 Conference. He was named first-team All-Pac-12 as a sophomore with Arizona.

Youth career
In May 2018, Tubelis won the 2017–18 Adidas Next Generation Tournament (ANGT) with the U18 team of Lietuvos rytas Vilnius. On 18 October 2018, he signed a long-term contract with Rytas Vilnius. In the 2018–19 season, he played for Perlas in the National Basketball League (NKL), the second-tier league of Lithuania. He averaged 9.6 points, 3.7 rebounds and 1.4 steals per game. In February 2019, Tubelis played for Rytas' U18 team at ANGT Kaunas, where he was named to the all-tournament team after averaging 15.3 points, 6.5 rebounds, three steals and 2.8 blocks per game. In June 2019, Tubelis took part in the Basketball Without Borders Europe Camp in Riga. 

In 2019–20, Tubelis split playing time between Perlas and Rytas' senior team, emerging as one of the top players in the NKL. He debuted for the senior team in a 6 October 2019 win over Juventus Utena. Tubelis scored an LKL season-high 11 points in a victory over Šiauliai on 1 February 2020. At ANGT Kaunas in February 2020, he averaged 20.5 points and 12.5 rebounds, leading Rytas' U18 team to first place and earning tournament most valuable player honors. Later that month, Tubelis participated in the Basketball Without Borders Global Camp at 2020 NBA All-Star Weekend in Chicago. In 25 NKL games, he averaged 16.4 points, 6.2 rebounds, 1.5 steals and 1.5 blocks per game.

College career
On 27 May 2020, Tubelis committed to play college basketball for Arizona. He joined the team with his twin brother, Tautvilas. Tubelis was considered a four-star recruit by 247Sports.

On 2 February 2023, Tubelis posted a career-high 40 points and nine rebounds in an 91–76 win over Oregon. As a freshmen, he averaged 12.2 points and 7.1 rebounds per game, and was named to the All-Pac-12 honorable mention and All-Freshman Team. Tubelis was named first-team All-Pac-12 as a sophomore.

National team career
Tubelis played for Lithuania at the 2016 FIBA U16 European Championship in Radom, where he averaged 4.9 points and 4.3 rebounds per game. At the 2018 FIBA U16 European Championship in Novi Sad, he averaged 14.3 points, 10.4 rebounds and 2.7 blocks per game. Tubelis represented Lithuania at the 2019 FIBA U18 European Championship in Volos, averaging 14.9 points, 12.6 rebounds and 3.4 blocks per game.

Career statistics

College

|-
| style="text-align:left;"|2020–21
| style="text-align:left;"|Arizona
| 26 || 20 || 26.7 || .498 || .310 || .692 || 7.1 || 1.2 || .6 || .6 || 12.2
|-
| style="text-align:left;"|2021–22
| style="text-align:left;"|Arizona
| 36 || 35 || 24.6 || .540 || .263 || .669 || 6.2 || 2.3 || 1.1 || .7 || 13.9
|-
| style="text-align:left;"|2022–23
| style="text-align:left;"|Arizona
| 35 || 34 || 30.1 || .570 || .313 || .764 || 9.1 || 2.0 || 1.1 || .7 || 19.8
|- class="sortbottom"
| style="text-align:center;" colspan="2"| Career
| 97 || 89 || 27.1 || .544 || .295 || .714 || 7.5 || 1.9 || 1.0 || .7 || 15.6

Personal life
Tubelis has a twin brother, Tautvilas, who also currently plays basketball for the Arizona Wildcats and has represented Lithuania at the international level. Tubelis' first name, Ąžuolas, translates to oak in Lithuanian and was given to him by his grandfather.

References

External links
Arizona Wildcats bio

2002 births
Living people
All-American college men's basketball players
Arizona Wildcats men's basketball players
Basketball players from Vilnius
BC Rytas players
Lithuanian expatriate basketball people in the United States
Lithuanian men's basketball players
Lithuanian twins
Power forwards (basketball)
Twin sportspeople